José Bustamante (born 15 January 2000), is a Peruvian professional soccer player who plays as a forward for Deportivo Llacuabamba.

References

External links

2000 births
Living people
Peruvian footballers
Association football forwards
Peruvian Primera División players
Footballers from Lima